The 1956 Men's South American Volleyball Championship, the 2nd tournament, took place in 1956 in Montevideo.

Final positions

Mens South American Volleyball Championship, 1956
Men's South American Volleyball Championships
V
International volleyball competitions hosted by Uruguay
1956 in Uruguayan sport